Aswan (also ;) is a city in Southern Egypt, and is the capital of the Aswan Governorate.

Aswan is a busy market and tourist centre located just north of the Aswan Dam on the east bank of the Nile at the first cataract. The modern city has expanded and includes the formerly separate community on the island of Elephantine.

Aswan includes five monuments within the UNESCO World Heritage Site of the Nubian Monuments from Abu Simbel to Philae (despite Aswan being neither Nubian, nor between Abu Simbel and Philae); these are the Old and Middle Kingdom tombs of Qubbet el-Hawa, the town of Elephantine, the stone quarries and Unfinished Obelisk, the Monastery of St. Simeon and the Fatimid Cemetery. The city's Nubian Museum is an important archaeological center, containing finds from the International Campaign to Save the Monuments of Nubia prior to the Aswan Dam's flooding of all of Lower Nubia.

The city is part of the UNESCO Creative Cities Network in the category of craft and folk art. Aswan joined the UNESCO Global Network of Learning Cities in 2017.

Other spellings and variations
Aswan was formerly spelled Assuan or Assouan. Names in other languages include (proposed Biblical Hebrew: סְוֵנֵה Sǝwēnê). The Nubians also call the city Dib which means "fortress, palace" and is derived from the Old Nubian name ⲇⲡ̅ⲡⲓ.

History 

Aswan is the ancient city of Swenett, later known as Syene, which in antiquity was the frontier town of Ancient Egypt facing the south. Swenett is supposed to have derived its name from an Egyptian goddess with the same name. This goddess later was identified as Eileithyia by the Greeks and Lucina by the Romans during their occupation of Ancient Egypt because of the similar association of their goddesses with childbirth, and of which the import is "the opener". The ancient name of the city also is said to be derived from the Egyptian symbol for "trade", or "market".

Because the Ancient Egyptians oriented themselves toward the origin of the life-giving waters of the Nile in the south, and as Swenett was the southernmost town in the country, Egypt always was conceived to "open" or begin at Swenett. The city stood upon a peninsula on the right (east) bank of the Nile, immediately below (and north of) the first cataract of the flowing waters, which extended to it from Philae. Navigation to the delta was possible from this location without encountering a barrier.

The stone quarries of ancient Egypt located here were celebrated for their stone, and especially for the granitic rock called syenite. They furnished the colossal statues, obelisks, and monolithic shrines that are found throughout Egypt, including the pyramids; and the traces of the quarrymen who worked in these 3,000 years ago are still visible in the native rock. They lie on either bank of the Nile, and a road,  in length, was cut beside them from Syene to Philae.

Swenett was equally important as a military station and for its position on a trade route. Under every dynasty it was a garrison town; and here tolls and customs were levied on all boats passing southwards and northwards. Around 330, the legion stationed here received a bishop from Alexandria; this later became the Coptic Diocese of Syene. The city is mentioned by numerous ancient writers, including Herodotus, Strabo, Stephanus of Byzantium, Ptolemy, Pliny the Elder, Vitruvius, and it appears on the Antonine Itinerary. It may also be mentioned in the Book of Ezekiel and the Book of Isaiah.

From this frontier town to the northern extremity of Egypt, the river flows for more than  without bar or cataract. The voyage from Aswan to Alexandria usually took 21 to 28 days in favorable weather.

Archaeological findings 
In April 2018, the Egyptian Ministry of Antiquities announced the discovery of the head of the bust of Roman Emperor Marcus Aurelius at the Temple of Kom Ombo during work to protect the site from groundwater.

In September 2018, the Egyptian Antiquities Minister Khaled el-Enany announced that a sandstone sphinx statue had been discovered at the temple of Kom Ombo.

Archaeologists discovered 35 mummified remains of Egyptians in a tomb in Aswan in 2019. Italian archaeologist Patrizia Piacentini and El-Enany both reported that the tomb, where the remains of ancient men, women and children were found, dates back to the Greco-Roman period between 332 BC and 395 AD. While the findings assumed belonging to a mother and a child were well preserved, others had suffered major destruction. Other than the mummies, artifacts including painted funerary masks, vases of bitumen used in mummification, pottery and wooden figurines were revealed. Thanks to the hieroglyphics on the tomb, it was detected that the tomb belongs to a tradesman named Tjit.

Piacentini commented “It's a very important discovery because we have added something to the history of Aswan that was missing. We knew about tombs and necropoli dating back to the second and third millennium, but we didn't know where the people who lived in the last part of the Pharaonic era were. Aswan, on the southern border of Egypt, was also a very important trading city”.

Stan Hendrick, John Coleman Darnell and Maria Gatto in 2012 excavated petroglyphic engravings from Nag el-Hamdulab in Aswan which featured representations of a boat procession, solar symbolism and the earliest depiction of the White Crown with an estimated dating range between 3200BC and 3100BC.

In February 2021, archaeologists from the Egyptian Ministry of Antiquities announced significant discoveries at an archaeological site called Shiha Fort in Aswan, namely a Ptolemaic period temple, a Roman fort, an early Coptic church and an inscription in hieratic script. According to Mostafa Waziri, the crumbling temple was decorated with palm leaf carvings and an incomplete sandstone panel that described a Roman emperor. Researcher Abdel Badie states more generally that the church contained ovens used to bake pottery, four rooms, a long hall, stairs, and stone tiles.

Geography 
Northern Tropic boundary

The latitude of the city that would become Aswan – located at 24° 5′ 23″ – was an object of great interest to the ancient geographers and mathematicians. They believed that it was seated immediately under the tropic, and that on the day of the summer solstice, a vertically positioned staff cast no shadow. They noted that the sun's disc was reflected in a deep well (or pit) at noon. This statement is only approximately correct; at the summer solstice, the shadow was only  of the staff, and so could scarcely be discerned, and the northern limb of the Sun's disc would be nearly vertical. More than 2200 years ago, Greek polymath Eratosthenes used this information to calculate earth's circumference.

Climate 

Aswan has a hot desert climate (Köppen climate classification BWh) like the rest of Egypt. Aswan and Luxor have the hottest summer days of any city in Egypt. Aswan is one of the hottest, sunniest and driest cities in the world. Average high temperatures are consistently above  during summer (June, July, August and also September) while average low temperatures remain above . Average high temperatures remain above  during the coldest month of the year while average low temperatures remain above . Summers are very prolonged and extremely hot with blazing sunshine although desert heat is dry. Winters are brief and pleasantly mild, though nights may be cool at times.

The desert city is one of the driest ones in the world, and rainfall doesn't occur every year, as of early 2001, the last rain there was seven years earlier. When heavy precipitation does occur, as in a November 2021 rain and hail storm, flash flooding can drive scorpions from their lairs to deadly effects. Aswan is one of the least humid cities on the planet, with an average relative humidity of only 26%, with a maximum mean of 42% during winter and a minimum mean of 16% during summer.

The weather of Aswan is extremely clear, bright and sunny year-round, in all seasons, with a low seasonal variation, with almost 4,000 hours of annual sunshine, very close to the maximum theoretical sunshine duration. Aswan is one of the sunniest places on Earth.

Infrastructure

Education 
In 2012, the Aswan University was inaugurated, which is headquartered in the city. Aswan is also home to the Aswan Higher Institute of Social Work, which was established in 1975.

Transport 
The city is crossed by the Cape to Cairo Road, which connects it to Luxor and Cairo to the north, and Abu Simbel and Wadi Halfa to the south. Also important is the Aswan-Berenice highway, which connects with the ports of the Red Sea.

Aswan is linked to Cairo by the Cape to Cairo Railway, which also connects it with Wadi Halfa. The railway is incomplete towards the south.

Other key transport infrastructures are the Port of Aswan, the largest river port in the region, and Aswan International Airport.

International relations

Twin towns/Sister cities 

Aswan is twinned with:

 Sonoma, California, United States

Gallery

See also

References

External links 

 Ancient Aswan City

 
Governorate capitals in Egypt
Archaeological sites in Egypt
Populated places in Aswan Governorate
Roman sites in Egypt
Tourism in Egypt
Medieval cities of Egypt
Upper Egypt